Vesti may refer to:

Media 
 Vesti (German newspaper), a Serbian-language newspaper in Germany
 Vesti (Israeli newspaper), a Russian-language newspaper in Israel
 Vesti (TV channel), the former name of the news channel Russia-24
 Vesti (Ukrainian newspaper), a Russian-language newspaper in Ukraine, see freedom of the press in Ukraine
 Vesti (VGTRK), the name of the news programmes on Russia-1 television
 Vesti FM, a Russian state owned news radio station

People with the surname 
 Bernhard Vesti, Swiss beach volleyball player; see 1999 European Beach Volleyball Championships
 Frederik Vesti (born 2002), Danish racing driver
 Walter Vesti (born 1950), Swiss alpine skier